is a district located in Nagano Prefecture, Japan.

As of 2003, the district has an estimated population of 19,073 and a density of 162.23 persons per km2. The total area is 117.57 km2.

Towns and villages
Obuse
Takayama

Districts in Nagano Prefecture